Pyramid Motors is a historic automobile showroom building located at Lynchburg, Virginia, United States. It is a one-story building with a yellow brick façade with contrasting red-brick details constructed in 1937. The building presented, like the Lincoln-Zephyr that the dealership sold, a streamlined, "modern" appearance in the Art Deco style.

It was listed on the National Register of Historic Places in 2007.   It is located in the Fifth Street Historic District.

References

Commercial buildings on the National Register of Historic Places in Virginia
Commercial buildings completed in 1937
Streamline Moderne architecture in Virginia
Retail buildings in Virginia
Buildings and structures in Lynchburg, Virginia
National Register of Historic Places in Lynchburg, Virginia
Individually listed contributing properties to historic districts on the National Register in Virginia